The 1954–55 NBA season was the Celtics' ninth season in the NBA.

Offseason

NBA Draft

Regular season

x = clinched playoff spot

Record vs. opponents

Game log

Playoffs

|- align="center" bgcolor="#ccffcc"
| 1
| March 15
| New York
| W 122–101
| Bob Cousy (30)
| —
| Boston Garden
| 1–0
|- align="center" bgcolor="#ffcccc"
| 2
| March 16
| @ New York
| L 95–102
| Bob Cousy (26)
| —
| Madison Square Garden III
| 1–1
|- align="center" bgcolor="#ccffcc"
| 3
| March 19
| @ New York
| W 116–109
| Bob Cousy (26)
| Bob Cousy (10)
| Madison Square Garden III
| 2–1
|-

|- align="center" bgcolor="#ffcccc"
| 1
| March 22
| @ Syracuse
| L 100–110
| Bill Sharman (20)
| —
| Bob Cousy (10)
| Onondaga War Memorial
| 0–1
|- align="center" bgcolor="#ffcccc"
| 2
| March 24
| @ Syracuse
| L 110–116
| Bill Sharman (32)
| Don Barksdale (10)
| Bob Cousy (15)
| Onondaga War Memorial
| 0–2
|- align="center" bgcolor="#ccffcc"
| 3
| March 26
| Syracuse
| W 100–97 (OT)
| Bob Cousy (23)
| Bob Brannum (15)
| Bob Cousy (8)
| Boston Garden
| 1–2
|- align="center" bgcolor="#ffcccc"
| 4
| March 27
| Syracuse
| L 94–110
| Bill Sharman (29)
| Bob Brannum (14)
| Bob Cousy (9)
| Boston Garden
| 1–3
|-

Awards and records
 Bob Cousy, All-NBA First Team
 Bill Sharman, All-NBA Second Team

References

Boston Celtics seasons
Boston Celtics
Boston Celtics
Boston Celtics
1950s in Boston